Acria equibicruris is a moth in the family Depressariidae. It was described by Wang in 2008. It is found in China (Guizhou).

The wingspan is 17–18 mm. The forewings are greyish white or grey, mottled with brown scales. The costal margin is ochreous yellowish-brown in the basal third and pale ocherous yellow along the notch, with yellowish brown scale tuft at one-third and two-thirds. There is a thin brown band from both sides of the notch, extending to above the dorsal corner of the cell, forming a V-pattern. The hindwings are greyish white.

References

Moths described in 2008
Acria